Richard Vines may refer to:
 Richard Vines (minister)
 Richard Vines (colonist)

See also
 Richard David Vine, American diplomat